Balkar Singh is an Indian athlete. He won a gold medal in Discus throw in the 1958 Tokyo Asian games.

References

Indian male discus throwers
Athletes (track and field) at the 1966 Asian Games
Athletes (track and field) at the 1958 Asian Games
Asian Games medalists in athletics (track and field)
Living people
Asian Games gold medalists for India
Asian Games bronze medalists for India
Medalists at the 1966 Asian Games
Medalists at the 1958 Asian Games
Year of birth missing (living people)